A carbon offset is a reduction or removal of emissions of carbon dioxide or other greenhouse gases made in order to compensate for emissions made elsewhere. Offsets are measured in tonnes of carbon dioxide-equivalent (CO2e). One ton of carbon offset represents the reduction or removal of one ton of carbon dioxide or its equivalent in other greenhouse gases. One of the hidden dangers of climate change policy is unequal prices of carbon in the economy, which can cause economic collateral damage if production flows to regions or industries that have a lower price of carbon—unless carbon can be purchased from that area, which offsets effectively permit, equalizing the price.

Within the voluntary market, demand for carbon offset credits is generated by individuals, companies, organizations, and sub-national governments who purchase carbon offsets to mitigate their greenhouse gas emissions to meet carbon neutral, net-zero or other established emission reduction goals. The voluntary carbon market is facilitated by certification programs which provide standards, guidance, and establish requirements for project developers to follow in order to generate carbon offset credits.

Offsets typically support projects that reduce the emission of greenhouse gases in the short- or long-term. A common project type is renewable energy, such as wind farms, biomass energy, biogas digesters, or hydroelectric dams. Others include energy efficiency projects like efficient cookstoves, the destruction of industrial pollutants or agricultural byproducts, destruction of landfill methane, and forestry projects. Carbon removal offsets include methods based on net-negative products and processes, such as biochar, carbonated building elements and geologically stored carbon.

Offsets may be cheaper or more convenient alternatives to reducing individual or organizational fossil fuel consumption. However, some critics object to carbon offsets, and question the benefits of certain types of offsets. Due diligence is recommended to help businesses in the assessment and identification of "good quality" offsets to ensure offsetting provides the desired additional environmental benefits, and to avoid reputational risk associated with poor quality offsets.

Features

Carbon offsets represent multiple categories of greenhouse gases, including carbon dioxide, methane, nitrous oxide (N2O), perfluorocarbons, hydrofluorocarbons, and sulfur hexafluoride.

Carbon offsets have several common features:

 Vintage. The vintage is the year in which the carbon emissions reduction project generates carbon offset credits. Credit generation typically occurs following third party review (also known as verification) as conducted by a validation-verification-body, designated operational entity, or other accredited third party reviewers. Typically, projects generate credits for emissions reducing activities or practices that have been measured to occur and only following third party review. However, there is a practice called "Forward Crediting" employed by a limited number of programs, whereby credits may be issued for projected emission reductions that the project developer anticipates. This practice risks over-issuing credits if the project does not realize its estimated impact, and allows credit buyers to claim emission reductions in the present for activities that have not yet occurred.
 Project type. The project type refers to the change that was implemented (i.e. the technology or practice employed) to reduce emissions through the project. Projects can include land-use (e.g. improved forestry management), methane capture, biomass sequestration, renewable energy, industrial energy efficiency, and many more.
Co-benefits. Beyond reducing greenhouse gas emissions, projects may provide benefits such as ecosystem services or economic opportunities for communities near the project site. These project benefits are termed "co-benefits". For example, projects that reduce agricultural greenhouse gas emissions may improve water quality by reducing fertilizer usage that results in run-off and may contaminate water.
 Certification regime. The certification regime describes the systems and procedures that are used to certify and register carbon offsets. Different methodologies are used for measuring and verifying emissions reductions, depending on project type, size and location. For example, the Clean Development Mechanism differentiates between large and small scale projects. In the voluntary market, a variety of industry standards exist. These include the Verified Carbon Standard, Plan Vivo Foundation, and the Gold Standard, which are implemented to provide third-party verification of carbon offset projects. Puro Standard, the first standard for engineered carbon removal, is verified by DNV GL. Gold Standard requires delivery and verification of sustainable development benefits alongside emission reductions. There are also some additional standards for the validation of co-benefits, including the CCBS, issued by Verra and the Social Carbon Standard, issued by the Ecologica Institute.
Both "The Oxford Principles for Net Zero Aligned Offsetting" and the Science Based Targets initiative's net-zero criteria argue for the importance of moving beyond offsets based on reduced or avoided emissions to offsets based on carbon that has been sequestered from the atmosphere, such as CO2 Removal Certificates.

Markets

The Kyoto Protocol has sanctioned offsets as a way for governments and private companies to earn carbon credits that can be traded on a marketplace. The protocol established the Clean Development Mechanism (CDM), which validates and measures projects to ensure they produce authentic benefits and are genuinely "additional" activities that would not otherwise have been undertaken. Organizations that are unable to meet their emissions quota can offset their emissions by buying CDM-approved Certified Emissions Reductions (CERs). However, the economy behind the carbon offsets generate a new type of consumption in the complexed carbon economies.

According to the World Bank State and Trends 2020 Report, 61 carbon pricing initiatives are in place or are scheduled for implementation globally. These include both emission trading schemes (like cap-and-trade systems) as well as carbon taxes and, although these initiatives represent markets for carbon, not all incorporate provisions for carbon offsets, but instead place greater emphasis on achieving emission reductions within the operations of regulated entities. The original compliance carbon market was initiated by the Kyoto Protocol's Clean Development Mechanism (CDM). Signatories to the Kyoto Protocol agreed to mandatory emission reduction targets, enabled (in part) by carbon offset purchases by higher-income countries from low- and middle-income countries, facilitated by the CDM. The Kyoto Protocol was to expire in 2020, to be superseded by the Paris Agreement. The Paris Agreement determinations regarding the role of carbon offsets are still being determined through international negotiation specifying the "Article 6" language. Compliance markets for carbon offsets comprise both international carbon markets developed through the Kyoto Protocol and Paris Agreement, and domestic carbon pricing initiatives that incorporate carbon offset mechanisms.

Many entities exist within the voluntary carbon market (see offsetguide.org for more information). For example, carbon offset vendors offer direct purchase of carbon offsets, often also offering other services such as designating a carbon offset project to support or measure a purchaser's carbon footprint. In 2016, about US$191.3 million of carbon offsets were purchased in the voluntary market, representing about 63.4 million metric tons of CO2e. In 2018 and 2019 the voluntary carbon market transacted 98 and 104 million metric tons of CO2e respectively. These programs generate carbon offset credits provided that an emission reduction or removal activity meets all program requirements, applies an approved project protocol (also called a methodology), and successfully passes third party review (also called verification). Once carbon offset credits are generated, any buyer may purchase them; for example an individual may purchase carbon offsets to compensate for the emissions resulting from air-travel (see more on Air-travel and Climate).

Global market

In 2009, 8.2 billion metric tons of carbon dioxide equivalent changed hands worldwide, up 68 per cent from 2008, according to the study by carbon-market research firm Point Carbon, of Washington and Oslo. But at EUR94 billion, or about $135 billion, the market's value was nearly unchanged compared with 2008, with world carbon prices averaging EUR11.40 a ton, down about 40 per cent from the previous year, according to the study. The World Bank's "State and Trends of the Carbon Market 2010" put the overall value of the market at $144 billion, but found that a significant part of this figure resulted from manipulation of a value added tax (VAT) loophole.

 90% of voluntary offset volumes were contracted by the private sector—where corporate social responsibility and industry leadership were primary motivations for offset purchases.
 Offset buyers' desire to positively impact the climate resilience of their supply chain or sphere of influence was evident in our data which identifies a strong relationship between buyers’ business sectors and the project categories from which they contract offsets.

UK market
Carbon offset projects in the UK are only available for the voluntary market, due to UN protocols on CERs. Woodland creation and peatland restoration are the two types of offset scheme in the UK which have recognised validation codes, through the Woodland Carbon Code and Peatland Code respectively.

Voluntary market
 Participants  A wide range of participants are involved in the voluntary market, including providers of different types of offsets, developers of quality assurance mechanisms, third party verifiers, and consumers who purchase offsets from domestic or international providers. Suppliers include for-profit companies, governments, charitable non-governmental organizations, colleges and universities, and other groups.

 Motivations  According to industry analyst Ecosystem Marketplace, the voluntary markets present the opportunity for citizen consumer action, as well as an alternative source of carbon finance and an incubator for carbon market innovation. In their survey of voluntary markets, data has shown that "Corporate Social Responsibility" and "Public Relations/Branding" are clearly in first place among motivations for voluntary offset purchases, with evidence indicating that companies seek to offset emissions "for goodwill, both of the general public and their investors".: In addition, regarding market composition, research indicates: "Though many analysts perceive pre-compliance buying as a dominant driving force in the voluntary market, the results of our survey have repeatedly indicated that precompliance motives (as indicated by 'investment/resale and 'anticipation of regulation') remain secondary to those of the pure voluntary market (companies/individuals offsetting their emissions)."

 Pre-compliance
  Buyers purchasing offsets for pre-compliance purposes are doing so with the expectation, or as a hedge against the possibility, of future mandatory cap and trade regulations. As a mandatory cap would sharply increase the price of offsets, firms—especially those with large carbon footprints and the corresponding financial exposure to regulation—make the decision to acquire offsets in advance at what are expected to be lower prices.

 Retail  Multiple players in the retail market have offerings that enable consumers and businesses to calculate their carbon footprint, most commonly through a web-based interface including a calculator or questionnaire, and sell them offsets in the amount of that footprint. In addition many companies selling products and services, especially carbon-intensive ones such as airline travel, offer options to bundle a proportional offsetting amount of carbon credits with each transaction.

 Suppliers of voluntary offsets operate under both nonprofit and social enterprise models, or a blended approach sometimes referred to as triple bottom line. Other suppliers include broader environmentally focused organizations with website subsections or initiatives that enable retail voluntary offset purchases by members, and government created projects.

 Features of companies that voluntarily offset emissions  Companies that voluntarily offset their own emissions tend to be of relatively low carbon intensity, as they can offset a significant proportion of their emissions at relatively low cost. Voluntary offsetting is particularly common in the financial sector. 61 per cent of financial companies in the FTSE 100 offset at least a portion of their 2009 emissions. Twenty-two per cent of financial companies in the FTSE 100 considered their entire 2009 operations to be carbon neutral.

In 2015, the UNFCCC created a dedicated website where organizations and companies as well as private persons are able to offset their footprint with the aim of facilitating everyone's participation in the process of promoting sustainability on a voluntary basis.

Types of offset projects
The CDM identifies over 200 types of projects suitable for generating carbon offsets, which are grouped into broad categories. These project types include renewable energy, methane abatement, energy efficiency, reforestation and fuel switching (i.e. to carbon-neutral fuels and carbon-negative fuels).

Renewable energy 
It is hard to show additionality for these projects.

Methane collection and combustion
Some offset projects consist of the combustion or containment of methane generated by farm animals (by use of an anaerobic digester), landfills or other industrial waste. Methane has a global warming potential (GWP) 23 times that of CO2. When combusted, each molecule of methane is converted to one molecule of CO2, thus reducing the global warming effect by 96%.

An example of a project using an anaerobic digester can be found in Chile where, in December 2000, the largest pork production company in Chile initiated a voluntary process to implement advanced waste management systems (anaerobic and aerobic digestion of hog manure), in order to reduce greenhouse gas (GHG) emissions.

Energy efficiency

While carbon offsets that fund renewable energy projects help lower the carbon intensity of energy supply, energy conservation projects seek to reduce the overall demand for energy. Carbon offsets in this category fund projects of several types:

 Cogeneration plants generate both electricity and heat from the same power source, thus improving upon the energy efficiency of most power plants, which waste the energy generated as heat.
 Fuel efficiency projects replace a combustion device with one using less fuel per unit of energy provided. Assuming energy demand does not change, this reduces the carbon dioxide emitted. This can take the form of both optimized industrial processes (reducing per unit energy costs) and individual action (bicycling to work as opposed to driving).
 Energy-efficient buildings reduce the amount of energy wasted in buildings through efficient heating, cooling or lighting systems. In particular, the replacement of incandescent light bulbs with LED lamps can have a drastic effect on energy consumption. New buildings can also be constructed using less carbon-intensive input materials.

Destruction of industrial pollutants
Industrial pollutants such as hydrofluorocarbons (HFCs) and perfluorocarbons (PFCs) have a GWP many thousands of times greater than carbon dioxide by volume. Because these pollutants are easily captured and destroyed at their source, they present a large and low-cost source of carbon offsets. As a category, HFCs, PFCs, and N2O reductions represent 71 per cent of offsets issued under the CDM.

Agriculture 
Soil is one of the important aspects of agriculture and can affect the amount of yield in the crops. During the years of agriculture, there has been a decrease in the amount of carbon that the soil is able to hold. The soil in agriculture is now holding 50% to 66% less carbon and this is due to the many practices that farmers or scientists use. Agriculture affects the environmental quality with the losses of nitrogen and phosphorus to the fields.  Soil is a key component to Green Infrastructure (GI), but most urban soils are physically, chemically, or biologically unsuitable for use of GI. 

The types of crops will have an effect of how well the crops are a carbon sink. The three major types of crop in China are rice, wheat and corn with a total 165.76 TgC. Rice had the highest amount of carbon sink between the three crops. Out of the 165.76 TgC of carbon sink, rice was able to contribute 48.71%.

Land use, land-use change and forestry
Land use, land-use change and forestry (LULUCF) projects focus on natural carbon sinks such as forests and soil. Trees are very efficient at sequestering the carbon from the atmosphere. There are a number of different types of LULUCF projects:

 Avoided deforestation is the protection of existing forests.
 Reforestation is the process of restoring forests on land that was once forested.
 Afforestation is the process of creating forests on land that was previously unforested, typically for longer than a generation.
 Soil management projects attempt to preserve or increase the amount of carbon sequestered in soil.

Deforestation, particularly in Brazil, Indonesia and parts of Africa, account for about 20 per cent of greenhouse gas emissions. On average, the removal of trees is 7–30% of the greenhouse gasses around the world. Deforestation can be avoided either by paying directly for forest preservation, or by using offset funds to provide substitutes for forest-based products. There is a class of mechanisms referred to as REDD schemes (Reducing emissions from deforestation and forest degradation), which may be included in a post-Kyoto agreement. REDD credits provide carbon offsets for the protection of forests, and provide a possible mechanism to allow funding from developed nations to assist in the protection of native forests in developing nations.The management of carbon tree storage is called forest offsets.

Reforestation could support an additional 0.9 billion hectares of continuous forest which could store the equivalent of 25% of the current atmospheric pool. Offset schemes using reforestation are available in developing countries, as well as an increasing number of developed countries including the US and the UK.

Almost half of the world's people burn wood (or fiber or dung) for their cooking and heating needs.

Links with emission trading schemes

Once it has been accredited by the UNFCCC, a carbon offset project can be used as carbon credit and linked with official emission trading schemes, such as the European Union Emission Trading Scheme or Kyoto Protocol, as Certified Emission Reductions. 

The voluntary Chicago Climate Exchange also includes a carbon offset scheme that allows offset project developers to sell emissions reductions to CCX members who have voluntarily agreed to meet emissions reduction targets.

The Western Climate Initiative, a regional greenhouse gas reduction initiative by states and provinces along the western rim of North America, includes an offset scheme. Likewise, the Regional Greenhouse Gas Initiative, a similar program in the northeastern U.S., includes an offset program. A credit mechanism that uses offsets may be incorporated in proposed schemes such as the Australian Carbon Exchange.

Carbon retirement

Carbon retirement involves retiring allowances from emission trading schemes as a method for offsetting carbon emissions. Voluntary purchasers can offset their carbon emissions by purchasing carbon allowances from legally mandated cap-and-trade programs such as the Regional Greenhouse Gas Initiative or the European Emissions Trading Scheme. By purchasing the allowances that power plants, oil refineries, and industrial facilities need to hold to comply with a cap, voluntary purchases tighten the cap and force additional emissions reductions.

Small-scale schemes

Voluntary purchases can also be made through small-scale and sometimes uncertified schemes such as those offered at South African-based Promoting Access to Carbon Equity Centre (PACE), which nevertheless offer clear services such as poverty alleviation in the form of renewable energy development. These projects have the potential to develop projects that are either too small or too complicated to benefit from legally mandated cap-and-trade programs.

Other
A UK offset provider set up a carbon offsetting scheme that set up a secondary market for treadle pumps in developing countries. These pumps are used by farmers, using human power, in place of diesel pumps. However, given that treadle pumps are best suited to pumping shallow water, while diesel pumps are usually used to pump water from deep boreholes, it is not clear that the treadle pumps are actually achieving real emissions reductions. Other companies have explored and rejected treadle pumps as a viable carbon offsetting approach due to these concerns.

Quality assurance schemes

Accounting for and verifying reductions

Owing to their indirect nature, many types of offset are difficult to verify. Some providers obtain independent certification that their offsets are accurately measured to distance themselves from potentially fraudulent competitors. The credibility of the various certification providers is often questioned. Certified offsets may be purchased from commercial or non-profit organizations for US$2.75–99.00 per tonne of CO2, due to fluctuations of market price. Annual carbon dioxide emissions in developed countries range from 6 to 23 tons per capita.
Accounting systems differ on precisely what constitutes a valid offset for voluntary reduction systems and for mandatory reduction systems. However formal standards for quantification exist based on collaboration between emitters, regulators, environmentalists and project developers. These standards include the Voluntary Carbon Standard, Plan Vivo Foundation, Green-e Climate, Chicago Climate Exchange and the Gold Standard, the latter of which expands upon the requirements for the Clean Development Mechanism of the Kyoto Protocol.

Criteria of Quality 
Accounting of offsets may address the following basic areas:

 Baseline and Measurement—What emissions would occur in the absence of a proposed project? And how are the emissions that occur after the project is performed going to be measured?
 Additionality—Would the project occur anyway without the investment raised by selling carbon offset credits? There are two common reasons why a project may lack additionality: (a) if it is intrinsically financially worthwhile due to energy cost savings, and (b) if it had to be performed due to environmental laws or regulations.
 Permanence—Are some benefits of the reductions reversible? (for example, trees may be harvested to burn the wood, and does growing trees for fuel wood decrease the need for fossil fuel?) If woodlands are increasing in area or density, then carbon is being sequestered. After roughly 50 years, forests begin to reach maturity, and remove carbon dioxide more quickly than a recently re-planted forest area.
 Leakage—Does implementing the project cause higher emissions outside the project boundary?
 Double-Counting—Is the project claimed as carbon offsetting by more than one organization?  
 Co-benefits—Are there other benefits in addition to the carbon emissions reduction, and to what degree?

Oxford Offsetting Principles
In September 2020, the University of Oxford launched new principles for credible carbon offsetting ("Oxford Offsetting Principles"). According to the principles, traditional carbon offsetting schemes are "unlikely to deliver the types of offsetting needed to ultimately reach net zero emissions." The Oxford Offsetting Principles are:
 "Cut emissions, use high quality offsets, and regularly revise offsetting strategy as best practice evolves
 "Shift to carbon removal offsetting. CO2 Removal Certificates (CORCs) are an example carbon removal credits based on the Puro Standard for CO2 removal
 "Shift to long-lived storage
 "Support the development of net zero aligned offsetting"

Co-benefits 
While the primary goal of carbon offsets is to reduce global carbon emissions, many offset projects also claim to lead to improvements in the quality of life for a local population. These additional improvements are termed co-benefits, and may be considered when evaluating and comparing carbon offset projects. Examples of potential co-benefits include better air and water quality and healthier communities.

For example, possible co-benefits from a project that replaces wood-burning stoves with ovens using a less carbon-intensive fuel could include:

 Lower non–greenhouse gas pollution (smoke, ash, and chemicals), which improves health in the home.
 Better preservation of forests, which are an important habitat for wildlife.

In a recent survey conducted by EcoSecurities, Conservation International, CCBA and ClimateBiz, of the 120 corporates surveyed more than 77 per cent rated community and found that environmental benefits were the prime motivator for purchasing carbon offsets.

Carbon offset projects can also decrease quality of life. For example, people who earn their livelihoods from collecting firewood and selling it to households could become unemployed if firewood is no longer used. A July 2007 paper from the Overseas Development Institute offers some indicators to be used in assessing the potential developmental impacts of voluntary carbon offset schemes:
 What potential does the project have for income generation?
 What effects might a project have on future changes in land use and could conflicts arise from this?
 Can small-scale producers engage in the scheme?
 What are the 'add on' benefits to the country—for example, will it assist capacity-building in local institutions?

Putting a price on carbon encourages innovation by providing funding for new ways to reduce greenhouse gases in many sectors. Carbon reduction goals drive the demand for offsets and carbon trading, encouraging the development of this new industry and offering opportunities for different sectors to develop and use innovative new technologies.

Carbon offset projects also provide savings – energy efficiency measures may reduce fuel or electricity consumption, leading to a potential reduction in maintenance and operating costs.

The UNFCCC has created a dedicated website where CDM activities and prior consideration projects are able to report their co-benefits on a voluntary basis.

Offsetting schemes and standards
The goal for governments around the world is to decrease the levels of carbon emissions by a certain date. Depending on the government, there are different goals that they set for themselves. An example of a government goal is Germany, their goal is to decrease the carbon emissions by 95% by 2050.

The Australian government's Emissions Reduction Fund provides for purchasing carbon offsets from Australian carbon emissions reduction projects. The Government has committed a total of $4.55 billion to the Fund.

In the UK: Quality Assurance Standard for Carbon Offsetting (QAS)

In an effort to inform and safeguard business and household consumers purchasing Carbon Offsets, in 2009, the UK Government has launched a scheme for regulating Carbon offset products. DEFRA have created the "Approved Carbon Offsetting" brand to use as an endorsement on offsets approved by the UK government. The Scheme sets standards for best practice in offsetting. Approved offsets have to demonstrate the following criteria:
 Accurate calculation of emissions to be offset
 Use of good quality carbon credits i.e. initially those that are Kyoto compliant
 Cancellation of carbon credits within a year of the consumers purchase of the offset
 Clear and transparent pricing of the offset
 Provision of information about the role of offsetting in tackling climate change and advice on how a consumer can reduce his or her carbon footprint
The first company to qualify for the scheme was Clear, followed by Carbon Footprint, Carbon Passport, Pure, British Airways and Carbon Retirement Ltd.

On 20 May 2011 the Department of Energy and Climate Change announced that the Quality Assurance Scheme would close on 30 June 2011. The stated purpose of the Quality Assurance Scheme was 'to provide a straightforward route for those wishing to offset their emissions to identify quality offsets'. Critics of the closure therefore argued that without the scheme, businesses and individuals would struggle to identify quality carbon offsets.

In 2012 the scheme was relaunched as the Quality Assurance Standard (QAS). The QAS is now run independently by Quality Assurance Standard Ltd which is a company limited by guarantee based in the United Kingdom. The Quality Assurance Standard is an independent audit system for carbon offsets, assessing multiple criteria. Approved offsets are checked against a 40-point checklist.

On 17 July 2012, the first organisations were approved as meeting the new QAS.

Controversies

A business-as-usual philosophy

Some activists disagree with the principle of carbon offsets, arguing that they prolongs a “business-as-usual” mindset, where companies are able to use carbon offsetting as a way to avoid making larger changes that deal with reducing carbon emissions at its source. George Monbiot, an English environmentalist and writer, likened them to Roman Catholic indulgences, a way for the guilty to pay for absolution rather than changing their behavior. Still other critics dismiss carbon offsets as "a license to pollute" for businesses, suggesting that it is nothing but greenwashing. As it is difficult to assess the exact results of carbon offsets given the fact that they are a relatively new form of carbon reduction, it is possible that many or most carbon offset purchases are made in an attempt to increase positive business public relations rather than to help solve the issue of greenhouse gas emissions.

In response, proponents of carbon offsets hold that the indulgence analogy is flawed because they claim carbon offsets actually reduce carbon emissions, changing the business as usual, and therefore address the root cause of climate change. Proponents of offsets claim that third-party certified carbon offsets are leading to increased investment in renewable energy, energy efficiency, methane biodigesters and reforestation and avoided deforestation projects, and claim that these alleged effects are the intended goal of carbon offsets. Ecosystem Marketplace reported in 2016 that companies that purchased carbon offsets were likely to be engaged in an overall carbon reduction strategy, not simply buying their way out of emissions.

In August 2006, three environmental non-governmental organizations (NGOs) — Greenpeace, World Wildlife Fund-UK (WWF) and Friends of the Earth — declared that carbon offsetting is often used as an "easy way out for governments, businesses and individuals to continue polluting without making changes to the way they do business or their behaviour".

Effectiveness 

By 2023 an investigation and a set of recent studies indicate that carbon emission reductions from projects launched to earn carbon-offset credits have been vastly overstated to the extent that ~90% of rainforest offset credits of the Verified Carbon Standard are called likely to be "phantom credits".

Lack of regulation and enforcement 
Several certification standards exist, offering variations for measuring emissions baseline, reductions, additionality, and other key criteria. However, no single standard governs the industry, and some offset providers have been criticized on the grounds that carbon reduction claims are exaggerated or misleading.

For example, an investigation by ProPublica and MIT Technology Review found that the carbon credits issued by the California Air Resources Board used a formula that calculated the amount of timber that could be logged from a given parcel of land, given typical exploitation patterns, rather than the amount that likely would be logged. This led to carbon credits being issued to conservation organizations like Massachusetts Audubon Society in return for not logging forests they presumably had no intention of cutting down. This resulted in the emissions of California polluters Phillips 66, Shell Oil Company, and Southern California Gas Company not being offset by forest sequestration.

Point Carbon has reported on an inconsistent approach with regard to some hydro-electric projects as carbon offsets; some countries in the EU are not allowing large projects into the EU ETS, because of their environmental impacts, even though they have been individually approved by the UNFCCC and World Commission on Dams.

Issues with tree-planting for carbon offsetting 
One of the most popular types of projects to produce carbon offsets is reforestation or tree planting. However, some environmentalist organizations have questioned the effectiveness of tree-planting projects for carbon offset purposes. Critics point to the following issues with tree planting projects:
 Timing. Trees reach maturity over a course of many decades. Project developers and offset retailers typically pay for the project and sell the promised reductions up-front, a practice known as "forward selling".
 Permanence. It is difficult to guarantee the permanence of the forests, which may be susceptible to clearing, burning, or mismanagement. The well-publicized instance of the "Coldplay forest", in which a forestry project supported by the British band Coldplay resulted in a grove of dead mango trees, illustrates the difficulties of guaranteeing the permanence of tree-planting offsets. When discussing "tree offsets, forest campaigner Jutta Kill of European environmental group FERN, clarified the physical reality that "Carbon in trees is temporary: Trees can easily release carbon into the atmosphere through fire, disease, climatic changes, natural decay and timber harvesting."
 Monocultures and invasive species. In an effort to cut costs, some tree-planting projects introduce fast-growing invasive species that end up damaging native forests and reducing biodiversity. For example, in Ecuador, the Dutch FACE Foundation has an offset project in the Andean Páramo involving 220 square kilometres of eucalyptus and pine planted. The NGO Acción Ecológica criticized the project for destroying a valuable Páramo ecosystem by introducing exotic tree species, causing the release of much soil carbon into the atmosphere, and harming local communities who had entered into contracts with the FACE Foundation to plant the trees. However, some certification standards, such as the Climate Community and Biodiversity Standard require multiple species plantings.
 Methane. A 2006 study claimed that plants are a significant source of methane, a potent greenhouse gas, raising the possibility that trees and other terrestrial plants may be significant contributors to global methane levels in the atmosphere. However, this claim was disputed by findings in 2007 study.
 The albedo effect. Another study suggested that "high latitude forests probably have a net warming effect on the Earth's climate", because their absorption of sunlight creates a warming effect that balances out their absorption of carbon dioxide.
 Necessity. Corporate tree-planting is not a new idea; farming operations have been used by companies making paper from trees for a long time. If farmed trees are replanted, and the products made from them are placed into landfills rather than recycled, a very safe, efficient, economical and time-proven method of geological sequestration of greenhouse carbon is the result of the paper product use cycle. This only holds if the paper in the land fill is not decomposted. In most landfills, this is the case and leads to the fact that more than half of the greenhouse gas emissions from the life cycle of paper products occur from landfills methane emissions.

Carbon equivalences 
There is a longstanding social-science critique of "making things the same" in the realm of carbon accounting. For most carbon offsetting schemes the framework "a ton is a ton" is applied. This means that a ton of carbon released in the atmosphere is treated as equivalent to a ton of carbon removed from the atmosphere. While this simplification is useful in carbon accounting and for the creation of carbon budgets, it becomes misleading when applied to global carbon emission reduction and the maximum global average temperature increase goal of less than 1.5˚C. The simplification is especially misleading when the negative emissions promised through the carbon credits will only take place in the future. The transaction hence becomes riskier, as in the present there are only positive emissions.

First, when treating biotic and fossil carbon equivalent, it becomes difficult to evaluate if the mitigation was achieved through the reduction of fossil carbon or increased biotic sequestration. Suggesting that if enough action is taken in increased bio sequestration, any reduction in the use of fossil carbon can be delayed. For example, the energy sector can still be putting out  emissions if the agriculture sector becomes "greener". Nonetheless, the technological, social, and economic transitions required in both these sectors differ significantly, as do their relative contributions to climate change.

Some, on the other hand, argue that natural carbon sinks do not have the capacity to remove enough CO2 stemming from fossil fuels in a relevant time frame to hinder global warming, rendering carbon offsetting as not beneficial. Adding to this dilemma is the option for firms to offset any, not just hard to abate carbon emissions with credits bought through managed carbon sinks. If the price of buying credits to offset is lower than reducing their use of  emissions, then the firms are incentivised to burn fossil fuel instead and then “ask for forgiveness” adding more emissions to the active carbon cycle and requiring more land to be reserved for carbon sequestration.

Economic efficiency 

In 2009, Carbon Retirement reported that less than 30 pence in every pound spent on some carbon offset schemes goes directly to the projects designed to reduce emissions. The figures reported by the BBC and based on UN data reported that typically 28p goes to the set up and maintenance costs of an environmental project. 34p goes to the company that takes on the risk that the project may fail. The project's investors take 19p, with smaller amounts of money being distributed between organisations involved in brokering and auditing the carbon credits. In that respect carbon offsets are similar to most consumer products, with only a fraction of sale prices going to the off-shore producers, the rest being shared between investors and distributors who bring it to the markets, who themselves need to pay their employees and service providers such as advertising agencies most of the time located in expensive areas.

Equity 
Under the Clean Development Mechanism, more developed countries could gain credits by providing funding for projects in developing countries that promote sustainable development. This automatically sets up an economic hierarchy as well as a separation between policy and practice. The former concern reinforces the existing global north–south discourse in the environmental and development arena, where countries in the global North are seen as benevolent aides providing a guiding hand to the poor and unsustainable global South.

Indigenous land rights issues 
Tree-planting projects can cause conflicts with indigenous people who are displaced or otherwise find their use of forest resources curtailed. For example, a World Rainforest Movement report documents land disputes and human rights abuses at Mount Elgon. In March 2002, a few days before receiving Forest Stewardship Council (FSC) certification for a project near Mount Elgon, the Uganda Wildlife Authority evicted more than 300 families from the area and destroyed their homes and crops. That the project was taking place in an area of on-going land conflict and alleged human rights abuses did not make it into the FSC project report. A 2011 report by Oxfam International describes a case where over 20,000 farmers in Uganda were displaced for a FSC-certified plantation to offset carbon by London-based New Forests Company.

Perverse incentives

Because offsets provide a revenue stream for the reduction of some types of emissions, they can in some cases provide incentives to emit more, so that emitting entities can later get credit for reducing emissions from an artificially high baseline. This is especially the case for offsets with a high profit margin. For example, one Chinese company generated $500 million in carbon offsets by installing a $5 million incinerator to burn the HFCs produced by the manufacture of refrigerants. The huge profits provided incentive to create new factories or expand existing factories solely for the purpose of increasing production of HFCs and then destroying the same HFCs to generate offsets. Not only is this outcome environmentally undesirable, it undermines other offset projects by causing offset prices to collapse. The practice had become so common that offset credits are now no longer awarded for new plants to destroy HFC-23.

In Nigeria oil companies flare off 40 per cent of the natural gas found. The Agip Oil Company plans to build plants to generate electricity from this gas and thus claim 1.5 million offset credits a year. United States company Pan Ocean Oil Corporation has also applied for credits in exchange for processing its own waste gas in Nigeria. Oilwatch.org's Michael Karikpo calls this "outrageous", as flaring is illegal in Nigeria, adding that "It's like a criminal demanding money to stop committing crimes".

See also

 Carbon dioxide removal
 Carbon neutrality
 Business action on climate change
 Carbon Offsetting and Reduction Scheme for International Aviation 
Carbon Dioxide Removal 
 Carbon sequestration
 Carbon tax
 Clean Development Mechanism
 Gold Standard (carbon offset standard)
 Ecosystem Marketplace
 Emissions trading
 Climate change mitigation
 Personal carbon trading
 Perverse incentive
 Renewable Energy Certificate (United States)
 Weighted average cost of carbon
 Low-carbon economy

References

External links

Definition: Carbon Offsets
Calculator: Carbon Offset

Carbon finance
Renewable energy
Greenhouse gas emissions